"Follow Me" is a song released by Greek-Swedish duo Antique. It was released in January 2002 as the third and final single from their album Die for You. The song reached number 15 in Sweden.

Music video
A music video for the song was filmed originally in English and later in mixed Greek and English in order to promote it as a single from their album Me Logia Ellinika.

Track listing
 "Follow Me" (Radio Edit) - 3:28
 "Follow Me" (Kosmonova Remix) - 6:33
 "Follow Me" (Sun Divers Remix) - 8:35
 "Follow Me" (Original Club Edit) - 8:07

Charts

References

2003 singles
Antique (band) songs
Songs written by Alex P
English-language Swedish songs
English-language Greek songs
Songs written by Kleerup